Bedford is a township municipality in the Canadian province of Quebec, located within the Brome-Missisquoi Regional County Municipality. The population as of the Canada 2011 Census was 699.

Demographics 

Population trend:

Mother tongue language (2006)

See also
List of township municipalities in Quebec

References 

Township municipalities in Quebec
Incorporated places in Brome-Missisquoi Regional County Municipality